Amnesia refers to a variety of conditions in which memory is lost or disturbed.

Amnesia may also refer to:

Film and television 
 Amnesia (TV series), a British two-part mini-series
 Amnesia (1994 film), a Chilean film
 Amnèsia, a 2002 Italian film directed by Gabriele Salvatores
 Amnesia (2015 film), a Swiss-French film
 AmnesiA, a 2001 Dutch cult film directed by Martin Koolhoven
 Amnesia (game show), stylized as Amne$ia, a 2008 American quiz show
 "Amnesia", an episode of Code Lyoko
 "Amnesia", an episode of Diagnosis Murder

Literature 
 Amnesia (Cooper novel), a 1992 novel by Douglas Cooper
 Amnesia (Carey novel), a 2014 novel by Peter Carey
 "Amnesia", a 1982 story by Jack Dann

Comics 
 "Amnesia" (1997 comic), a comic short story by Al Columbia
 Amnesia: The Lost Films of Francis D. Longfellow, a 2018 comic book by Al Columbia

Music

Albums 
 Amnesia (Hamlet album), 2011
 Amnesia (Pousette-Dart Band album), or the title song, 1977
 Amnesia (Richard Thompson album), 1988
 Ammnesia, a 1988 album by Mr. Fingers
 Amnesia (EP), a 2009 EP by Paint It Black
 Amnesia, a 1988 album by Larry Heard

Songs 
 "Amnesia" (5 Seconds of Summer song), 2014
 "Amnesia" (Cherish song), 2008
 "Amnesia" (Chumbawamba song), 1998
 "Amnesia" (Ian Carey song) and Rosette featuring Timbaland and Brasco, 2012
 "Amnesia" (José José song), 1990
 "Amnesia" (KMFDM song), 2012
 "Amnesia" (Roxen song), 2021
 "Amnesia" (Skepta song), 2011
 "Amnesia", by Anahí from Inesperado, 2016
 "Amnesia", by Britney Spears from Circus
 "Amnesia", by Cheryl Cole from Messy Little Raindrops
 "Amnesia", by Dead Can Dance from Anastasis, 2012
 "Amnesia", by Inspector featuring Rubén Albarrán and Roco Pachukote, 2002
 "Amnesia", by Justin Timberlake from The 20/20 Experience – 2 of 2
 "Amnesia", by Kim Dotcom, 2012
 "Amnesia", by The Mekons from The Mekons Rock 'n Roll, 1989
 "Amnesia", by Saga, from Worlds Apart, 1981
 "Amnesia", by Shalamar from Heartbreak
 "Amnesia", by Skinny Puppy from The Process
 "Amnesia", by Swans from Love of Life
 "Amnesia", by Toad the Wet Sprocket from Coil
 "Amnesia", by The Vines from Winning Days

Other uses in music
 Amnesia (nightclub), a nightclub in Ibiza, Spain
 Amnesia, a music project of Brad Laner

Video games 
 Amnesia (1986 video game), a 1986 text-adventure computer game written by science fiction author Thomas M. Disch
Amnesia (2011 video game), a 2011 Japanese visual novel for the PlayStation Portable
 Amnesia: The Dark Descent, a 2010 graphic adventure survival horror game
 Amnesia: A Machine for Pigs, a 2013 survival horror game
 Amnesia: Rebirth, a 2020 survival horror game

See also
 Amnesiac (album), a 2001 album by Radiohead
 Amnesiac (film), a 2014 film by Michael Polish
 Amnesiac gene, a Drosophila gene
 The Amnesic Incognito Live System, a Linux distribution replacing Incognito
 Mnesia, a distributed, soft real-time database management system written in the Erlang programming language